Familia is a 2005 French-language Canadian drama film. It was directed and written by Louise Archambault.

Plot 
The story revolves around two main characters: Michèle (Moreau, also known as "Charlotte Rocks her Socks"), a free-spirited aerobics instructor with a penchant for gambling, and Janine (Grenon), a suburban housewife and home decorator with a cheating husband.  The lives of these two longtime friends intersect when Michele goes to live with Janine to escape an abusive boyfriend.  Tensions abound as Michele's daughter Marguerite (St. Sauveur) introduces Janine's daughter Gabrielle (Gosselin) to a world of boys, drugs, and alcohol.  Meanwhile, Michele can't quite kick her gambling addiction - no matter how many people she seems to hurt and deceive.  Things come to a head when Janine confronts her adulterous husband and Marguerite discovers she's pregnant.

Cast

Awards
Archambault won the 2005 Claude Jutra Award for the best feature film by a first-time film director in Canada. In December 2005, the film was named to the Toronto International Film Festival's annual Canada's Top Ten list of the year's best films.

References

External links 
 

2005 films
Films directed by Louise Archambault
Canadian drama films
Best First Feature Genie and Canadian Screen Award-winning films
2005 drama films
2005 directorial debut films
French-language Canadian films
2000s Canadian films